Conus kevani is a species of sea snail, a marine gastropod mollusk in the family Conidae, the cone snails and their allies.

Like all species within the genus Conus, these snails are predatory and venomous. They are capable of "stinging" humans, therefore live ones should be handled carefully or not at all.

Description 
Original description: "Shell small for genus, thin, fragile; spire elevated with slightly concave sides; shoulder strongly keeled; shoulder keel ornamented with prominent, beadlike coronations; coronations become stronger on last whorl; body whorl heavily sculptured with 30 large cords; fine spiral threads between cords; spire whorls ornamented with 3 thin spiral threads; color pure white with 2 broken bands of pale brown dots, one above mid-body, one below mid-body; interior of aperture white; periostracum thin, pale brown, smooth."

The maximum recorded shell length is 17 mm.

Distribution
Locus typicus: "Gulf of Venezuela, near Monges Islands, Venezuela."

This species occurs in the Caribbean Sea off Venezuela.

Habitat 
Minimum recorded depth is 35 m. Maximum recorded depth is 35 m.

References

 Petuch, E. J. 1987. New Caribbean Molluscan Faunas. 111, plate 25, figure 8–9.
 Tucker J.K. & Tenorio M.J. (2009) Systematic classification of Recent and fossil conoidean gastropods. Hackenheim: Conchbooks. 296 pp.
 Puillandre N., Duda T.F., Meyer C., Olivera B.M. & Bouchet P. (2015). One, four or 100 genera? A new classification of the cone snails. Journal of Molluscan Studies. 81: 1–23

External links
 The Conus Biodiversity website
 

kevani
Gastropods described in 1987